The Patriarchate of Old Aquileia existed between 607 and 698 because of the Tricapitoline Schism in the Patriarchate of Aquileia. It was allied with the Arian Lombards, while the rival Patriarchate of Grado was allied with the Byzantine Empire.

Background
The bishops under the patriarch of Aquileia had split with Rome when they refused to condemn theologians who had been condemned by the rest of the Church.  After the Lombard invasion of Northern Italy they had fled to the island of Grado, then under control of the Byzantines, although for years they maintained the schism.  In 606 the newly elected bishop reconciled with Rome.

Split with Grado

Many mainland bishops, whose dioceses were under Lombard control were unhappy with the reconciliation.  These dissidents fled to mainland Aquileia and under Lombard protection elected a John as a rival patriarch who maintained the schism.  There were now two patriarchates in northern Italy, Aquileia in Grado and Old-Aquileia.

Thus, the schism deepened now along political Lombard-Roman lines.

Attempts at reconciliation

The Irish missionary Columbanus, who was ministering to the Lombards in Bobbio was involved in the first attempt to resolve this division through mediation between 612 and 615.  He was persuaded by Agilulf, King of the Lombards, to address a letter on the schism to Boniface IV. He tells the pope that he is suspect of heresy for accepting the Fifth Ecumenical Council (the Second Council of Constantinople in 553), and exhorts him to summon a council and prove his orthodoxy.

Edward Gibbon claims that Pope Honorius I reconciled the Patriarch to Rome in 638, although this did not last.

Reconciliation with Rome

As the schism lost its vigour, the Lombards started to renounce Arianism and become Catholics. The bishops of Old-Aquileia formally ended the schism at the Synod of Pavia in 698.  After Old-Aquileia reconciled with Rome, Pope Gregory II granted the pallium to Patriarch Serenus (715-730) of Aquileia in 723.  

The Patriarch of Old-Aquileia became simply the Patriarch of Aquileia, although the title was often claimed by the Patriarch of Grado - who was now more commonly known as simply the Patriarch of Grado.

Both sees were later suppressed.

Holders of the office

Holders of the office who were recorded are:

Ioannes I 606
Marcianus 623-628 
Fortunatus 628-663
Felix of Aquileia|Felix 649-?
Ioannes II 663-?  
Agathon 679-680 or 679-?
Ioannes III 680-?

References

Aquileia
Patriarchate of Aquileia